Berta Castañé García (born 5 November 2002 in Sabadell) is a Catalan Spanish actress and model known for her participation as Nuria Vega Valverde in the series Bajo sospecha (2015) and Carolina Solozábal in the series El secreto de Puente Viejo (2019–2020), both on Antena 3.

Biography 
Berta Castañé was born on November 5, 2002 in Sabadell, in the Spanish province of Barcelona.

Career 
Berta Castañé started in 2013 as a child model for Les enfants de l'eden. Later, she made her debut on television playing a leading role in the Antena 3 series Under suspicion, as Nuria Vega Valverde, a girl who disappears on the day of her communion and which gives rise to the events of the series. Later, she participated in the telefilms La Española inglesa and Laia. She has also been an ambassador for the firm Hortensia Maeso Girls and, among others, has starred in the campaign The Sweet Escape.

In 2016 she made her film debut with the film directed by Ventura Pons Oh, quina Joia!. That same year she starred in the series Big Band Clan, on the children's network Clan TV on Spanish Television, with the role of Ana. In 2017 she began to play Julia in the Catalan television series Com si fos ahir and, later, She returned to participate in a Ventura Pons film, Miss Dalí (2018), about the story of Salvador Dalí. In 2019 she was one of the protagonists of the Netflix original miniseries Días de Navidad, playing the character of Esther, who in Adulthood played Elena Anaya.

In 2019, she began to play the role of Carolina Solozábal in the Antena 3 daily series El secreto de Puente Viejo. In 2020, she played the role of Sol in the series The Barrier (La valla). Nello stesso anno has played the role of Girl in the short film Mil battles.

In January 2022, she played the role of Lucía in the Movistar Plus+ Todos mienten series, directed by Pau Freixas. In January of the same year he took part in the Feroz Awards for the Todos mienten series. Also in 2022 she played the role of Gaby in the Netflix series Welcome to Eden (Bienvenidos a Edén), participation already announced in 2021. Also in 2022 she starred in the Heridas series.

Filmografía

Film

TV series

Short films

References

External links 

 
 

2002 births
Living people
Spanish television actresses
Spanish female models